Granada Hills may refer to the following places in the United States:

 Granada Hills, Los Angeles
 Granada Hills, Austin, Texas